Hohenwalde is an Ortsteil of Frankfurt (Oder), Brandenburg, Germany, with a population of 425.

The town of Müllrose is also close by.

External links 

Villages in Brandenburg
Frankfurt (Oder)